Lugol may refer to:

 Jean Guillaume Auguste Lugol (1786-1851) - French doctor
 Lugol's iodine, a solution of iodine in potassium iodide, named after J. G. A. Lugol.